Nintendo Classic Mini can refer to:

NES Classic Edition, known as the Nintendo Classic Mini: Nintendo Entertainment System in Europe and Australia
Super NES Classic Edition, known as the Nintendo Classic Mini: Super Nintendo Entertainment System in Europe and Australia